Hickory House was a British television programme aimed at pre-school children. It was produced by Granada Television from 1973 to 1977 and broadcast on weekday lunchtimes.

Each programme was usually hosted by a pair of presenters, most often including Alan Rothwell. The setting was a normal house, but in Hickory House household objects were brought to life through puppetry. The puppet characters included Humphrey Cushion (a sleepy grey cushion with a fondness for bananas), Dusty Mop (a bad-tempered mop with a long red nose) and the Handle Family. The puppets were created by Barry Smith's Theatre of Puppets.

All 129 episodes survive in Granada's archive, although none has yet been released on DVD.

References

External links
Hickory House at thechestnut.com
Hickory House at sausageNet
 
 Hickory House at TV Cream

ITV children's television shows
1973 British television series debuts
1977 British television series endings
1970s British children's television series
British television shows featuring puppetry
Television series by ITV Studios
Television shows produced by Granada Television
English-language television shows
British preschool education television series